The white-finned gudgeon (Romanogobio albipinnatus) is a species of freshwater fish in the family Cyprinidae. It lives in the North Caspian basin in lower parts of the Volga and Ural River drainages. They can reach 13 cm in length.

References

Sources
 

Romanogobio
Cyprinid fish of Europe
Fish of Russia
Fish described in 1933
Taxonomy articles created by Polbot